Pietrosu Peak  ( or ) is a peak of crystalline rocks in the Călimani Mountains in the Carpathian Mountains, Romania which reaches a height of . Mapping of the moraines and glacial landforms below the peak indicate at least two  stages of glaciation during the Late Quaternary, subsequent to the initial one.

Notes

Mountains of Romania
Protected areas of Romania
Mountains of the Eastern Carpathians